Kenya–Slovakia relations are bilateral relations between Kenya and Slovakia.

History
Deputy Prime Minister and Foreign Minister of Slovakia, Miroslav Lajčák visited Kenya in 2014. He held talks with Kenya's Cabinet Secretary for Foreign Affairs and the Kenyan President.

Development cooperation
The Slovak government has aid projects worth KES. 206 million (EUR. 2 million). They mostly focus on healthcare, education, agriculture and public administration. Other areas of focus are employment, democracy and good governance. Kenya is one of two African countries under SlovakAid programmes.

Both countries also cooperate in trade, energy (nuclear), construction, transport, infrastructure, engineering, water, agriculture and information technologies.

Approximately 2000 Slovaks visit Kenya annually.

Nuclear power
Slovakia is assisting Kenya develop its nuclear capacity, so that Kenya can meet its future energy needs. Kenya aims to train 100 students annually and one of the countries where students are going to study at is Slovakia.

Trade
In 2011, trade between Kenya and Slovakia was worth KES. 632 million (EUR. 5.84 million). Kenya exported goods worth KES. 65.99 million (EUR. 0.61 million) to Slovakia and imported goods worth KES. 570 million (EUR. 5.27 million) from Slovakia.

Kenya's main exports to Slovakia include: cut flowers, legumes, fruits, nuts, coffee, and iron and steel screws and bolts.

Slovakia's main exports to Kenya include: paper, automobiles, fertilisers, machinery & equipment, computers and electronics.

See also
Foreign relations of Kenya
Foreign relations of Slovakia

Diplomatic missions
Kenya's embassy in Austria is accredited to Slovakia. Slovakia has an embassy in Nairobi.

External links
The Embassy of the Slovak Republic in Nairobi

References

 
Slovakia
Bilateral relations of Slovakia